McConnell House can refer to:

United States
(sorted by state, then city/town)
Edward Taylor McConnell House, Clarksville, Arkansas, listed on the National Register of Historic Places (NRHP) in Johnson County
W.J. McConnell House, Moscow, Idaho, listed on the NRHP in Latah County
Jackson-McConnell House, Junction City, Kansas, listed on the NRHP in Geary County
James McConnell House, Lexington, Kentucky, listed on the NRHP in Fayette County
William McConnell House, Lexington, Kentucky, listed on the NRHP in Fayette County
McConnell-Woodson-Philips House, Nicholasville, Kentucky, listed on the NRHP in Jessamine County
McConnell House, Law Office, and Slave Quarters, Wurtland, Kentucky, listed on the NRHP in Greenup County
Clark-McConnell House, Grants Pass, Oregon, listed on the NRHP in Josephine County
McConnell House (McConnellsburg, Pennsylvania), listed on the NRHP in Fulton County
Chancellor T.M. McConnell House, Chattanooga, Tennessee, listed on the NRHP in Hamilton County
John McConnell House, Maryville, Tennessee, listed on the NRHP in Blount County
McConnell-Neve House, Charlottesville, Virginia, listed on the NRHP in Charlottesville